A winal, uinal is a unit of time in the Maya Long Count calendar equal to 20 days (or kʼin). It is the 4th digit on the Maya Long Count date.

For example, in the Maya Long Count date 12.19.13.15.12 (December 5, 2006), the number 15 is the winal.

References

Maya calendars